Exact Editions is an integrated content management platform for magazine and book publishers. It was launched in 2005 by Adam Hodgkin, Daryl Rayner and Tim Bruce. The platform expanded from a web-based subscription service into developing branded iOS apps for Apple’s Newsstand. These use the freemium model, offering subscriptions via an in-app purchase. They allow users to sync issues for offline use, share app content via social media and email, and bookmark pages to return to.

The platform offers subscriptions to individuals and to institutions, as well as several titles in French and Spanish.

In 2009, the company launched an Android app called ‘Exactly’, which offers access to all titles. In 2012, they began offering publishers the additional option to offer apps on the Kindle Fire through the Amazon Appstore.

In 2012, Exact Editions launched its first complete digital archive for Gramophone magazine, offering subscribers access to 90 years' worth of back issues (1,000 issues in total). Since then, Dazed & Confuseds 20-year archive and The Wires 30-year archive have also been released.

Titles span a variety of subjects (news, music, technology, sport) and varying frequencies of publication (weekly, monthly, quarterly).

References

Online magazines published in the United Kingdom
Electronic publishing
Online publishing companies